Joan Hornig is an American jewelry designer.

Background

Early life and education
Hornig grew up in a suburb of Cleveland, Ohio. She graduated Phi Beta Kappa from Harvard College in 1977 with a degree in fine arts before going on to get her MBA at Columbia Business School in 1984.

Career
Hornig began her career in educational administration after briefly teaching art to elementary school children. In the late 1970s she worked as a capital campaign fundraiser, resident freshmen proctor and academic adviser at Harvard. Her career in the non-profit/higher education sector continued through the mid-1980s.

Hornig served as the Director of Corporate Relations and External Affairs at Columbia Business School prior to going to Wall Street in 1985. Her 20+ years of experience in the finance sector encompasses management, operations, administration, private equity, Hedge funds, marketing and consulting. 

She also worked as chief administrative officer of Mitchell Hutchins.

Throughout her extensive career, Hornig created jewelry as a hobby inspired by her knowledge of art history and the decorative arts. After September 11, 2001, Hornig decided to use her talents to benefit others.

Hornig started a nationwide trunk show tour in April, 2019.

Joan Hornig Jewelry

Joan Hornig Jewelry was founded in 2003 with the goal of making a statement and a difference. The company operates under the philosophy that Philanthropy is Beautiful®. 100% of the profit from each piece sold is donated to the 501(c)(3) of the purchaser's choice through the Joan B. Hornig Foundation.

The Joan Hornig Philanthropy is Beautiful® collection of earrings, necklaces, bracelets, and rings uses 18k green gold, sterling silver, and various precious and semi-precious stones. Hornig draws inspiration from her travels around the world and from her art history background.

To date, over 800 non-profit organizations dealing with education, medical research, social services, the arts, animal and human rights, and environmental protection have received donations by way of Joan Hornig Jewelry.

Limited edition special initiative pieces have also been designed for organizations such as UNICEF, Circle of Women, Help USA, ASPCA, the Girl Scouts, and Haiti relief, among others.

Pavé The Way Jewelry
In September 2018, Hornig released a line of jewelry that donates 100% of its profit to the charity of the purchaser's choice. Each jewelry piece represents current political and social causes, ranging from female empowerment to gun violence and environmentalism. Earlier in 2018, Hornig had previously run a campaign to raise funds for Hurricane Maria's impact on Puerto Rico.

Retail Locations

Her jewelry has been sold by many stores around the country, including Bergdorf Goodman. Joan Hornig Jewelry also sold a limited collection through The MiA Project and has had various accounts with boutiques across America, such as Tootsies and online.

Worn By

Many celebrities and politicians have been spotted in Joan Hornig Jewelry. On the red carpet, Hornig’s jewelry has been worn by Jennifer Lopez, Katherine Heigl, Megan Fox, Jessica Alba, Cameron Diaz, Eva Mendes, Sandra Oh, Hilary Duff, Tina Fey, Paula Abdul, Hayden Panettiere, Amy Poehler, Olivia Wilde, America Ferrera, Claire Danes, Emma Stone, Kourtney Kardashian, Elizabeth Moss, Naomi Watts, Kerry Washington, Michelle Pfeiffer, and Anna Kendrick, among others. Oprah Winfrey has also been seen sporting Joan Hornig Jewelry.

Joan Hornig Jewelry has been gifted by first ladies Laura Bush and Michele Obama to visiting dignitaries to The White House. Former Secretary of State Hillary Rodham Clinton has been seen in earrings and necklaces designed by Hornig, as well.

Awards and recognition
Philanthropy is Beautiful® was named Social Enterprise Innovator of the Year 2022 by AI Global Media.

In 2016, Joan received awards from the Museum of Arts and Design and the Women's Entrepreneurship Day Pioneer Award at the United Nations.

She was also honored, in 2015, by United Cerebral Palsy of New York City.

In 2014, Hornig was the designer honoree at the FIT Foundation Annual Awards Gala. In the same year, she received the NECO Ellis Island Medal of Honor.

On April 23, 2012, Hornig rang the closing bell on the floor of the New York Stock Exchange, an honor awarded for Joan Hornig Jewelry’s unique business model and to celebrate the 10-year anniversary of the company.

For her philanthropic work, Hornig has been nominated for a 2010 MSN Butterfly Award in the category of Most Inspirational Person.

In recognition of Joan’s social entrepreneurship, she was also selected as Hallmark’s featured speaker at their biannual Trend Awards Week in 2009.

In 2008, the National Jewelry Institute selected Joan Hornig Jewelry to be part of the first Contemporary Jewelry Designer Showcase on display at The Forbes Galleries in New York.

In 2003, Hornig founded Joan Hornig Jewelry, transitioning fully from a career in finance to arts and philanthropy.

After September 11, 2001, Hornig decided to use her talents to benefit others.

The Joan B. Hornig Foundation

In 2003, Hornig established the Joan B. Hornig Foundation with the mission to provide support for registered charitable organizations throughout the world. 100% of the profit from Joan Hornig Jewelry is donated by way of the Joan B. Hornig Foundation. Contributions have been made to over 900 organizations to date. Here is an up-to-date list of benefiting non-profits organizations. Sales to date have generated substantial contributions to over 700 different organizations across the globe.

Affiliations

Hornig serves on the board of trustees for the Fashion Institute of Technology since June 30, 2015 and in 2018, joined as a council member for the New York State Council on the Arts.

She and her husband George founded the Sundance Theater. Joan holds a B.A. Magna Cum Laude in Fine Arts from Harvard College and an MBA from Columbia Business School.

Writings
Hornig has been a featured writer on New York Lifestyles Magazine.

Personal life
Hornig resides in New York City and also spends time in Los Angeles. She and her husband George Hornig have spent time living in Southampton, New York as well, where they restored a 1860s-era barn in the area to give back to the community.

References

 Forward article
 Reuters article
 Bergdorf Goodman Collection press release
 02138 magazine
 Haute Living
 NY 1

Living people
American jewelry designers
Columbia Business School alumni
Harvard College alumni
Year of birth missing (living people)
Women jewellers